Cham-e Chenar (also Romanized as Cham-e Chenār; also known as Cham Chenār) is a village in Kamfiruz-e Shomali Rural District, Kamfiruz District, Marvdasht County, Fars Province, Iran. At the 2006 census, its population was 184, in 47 families.

References 

Populated places in Marvdasht County